To Kingdom Come: The Definitive Collection is an anthology by Canadian-American rock band the Band, released in 1989. The thirty-one tracks were mostly taken from the group's eight albums on Capitol Records. The group's better-known songs, such as "The Weight", "Up on Cripple Creek", "Chest Fever", "The Night They Drove Old Dixie Down", "The Shape I'm In", "Life Is a Carnival" and "It Makes No Difference", are all present. Rarities such as "Loving You Is Sweeter Than Ever", "Get Up Jake" and "Back to Memphis" are also present.

The title track originally appeared on Music from Big Pink and is one of the very few sung by guitarist and principal lyricist Robbie Robertson. It was released on three LPs and two CDs.

To Kingdom Come is now out of print.

Track listing

Disc one

Disc two

Personnel
The Band – producers (tracks 1, 9, 14–31)
John Simon – producer (tracks 2–8, 10–13)
Rick Danko – bass, fiddle, rhythm guitar, vocals
Levon Helm – drums, mandolin, vocals 
Garth Hudson – organ, piano, accordion, clavinet, wind instruments
Richard Manuel – piano, organ, clavinet, drums, harmonica, vocals
Robbie Robertson – guitars, autoharp, vocals
John Simon – tenor and baritone saxophones, tuba, baritone horn, electric piano
Van Morrison – vocals
Allen Toussaint – horn arrangements
Billy Mundi – drums
Byron Berline – fiddle

References

1989 greatest hits albums
Albums produced by John Simon (record producer)
Capitol Records compilation albums
The Band compilation albums